Robert Hamilton Duff  (5 August 1925 – 11 May 2006) was a New Zealand rugby union player and coach. A lock, Duff represented  at a provincial level, and was a member of the New Zealand national side, the All Blacks, from 1951 to 1956. He played 18 matches for the All Blacks, two of which were as captain, including 11 internationals. He later was coach of the All Blacks from 1972 to 1973.

Duff was elected as a member of the Lyttelton Borough Council, and served as deputy mayor for 12 years. He was also a justice of the peace—the youngest in the country at the time of his appointment—and between 1984 and 1994 served as a member of the New Zealand Racing Authority.

References

1925 births
2006 deaths
People from Lyttelton, New Zealand
People educated at Christchurch Boys' High School
New Zealand rugby union players
New Zealand international rugby union players
Canterbury rugby union players
Rugby union locks
New Zealand rugby union coaches
New Zealand national rugby union team coaches
New Zealand justices of the peace
Local politicians in New Zealand
New Zealand sports executives and administrators